Hyde Parker may refer to:
 Vice-Admiral Sir Hyde Parker, 5th Baronet (1714–1782)
 Admiral Hyde Parker (Royal Navy officer, born 1739) (1739–1807), second son Sir Hyde Parker, 5th Baronet
 Vice-Admiral Hyde Parker (Royal Navy officer, born 1784) (1784–1854), son of Admiral Sir Hyde Parker
 Sir Hyde Parker, 8th Baronet (1785–1856), Tory Member of Parliament for West Suffolk